Yeonguijeong was a title created in 1400, during the Joseon Kingdom and the Korean Empire times (1392–1910) and given to the Chief State Councillor as the highest government position of "Uijeongbu" (State Council). Existing for over 500 years, the function was handed over in 1895 during the Gabo Reform to the newly formed position of Prime Minister of Korea. Only one official at a time was appointed to the position and though was generally called Yeongsang, was also referred to as Sangsang, Sugyu or Wonbo. Although the title of Yeonguijeong was legally defined as the highest post in charge of all state affairs, its practical functions changed drastically depending on the particular King and whether that King's power was strong or weak.

The establishment 
The Korean Joseon inherited the state structure of its predecessor, the Goryeo (918–1392), but soon began to reorganize the government.  In 1400, the second year after King Jeongjong ascended to the throne, he renamed the Privy Council or Dopyeonguisasa, the highest assigned post in charge of the state affairs of Goryeo, to "Uijeongbu" and let the post be called "yeonguijeong busa" (領議政府事). As both functions of Uijeongbu got stronger, and its system was further revised, Yeonguijeong busa was renamed to Yeonguijeong in a firm establishment of the office.

In 1466, the position was officially put in statutory form as Gyeongguk daejeon (Complete Code of Law) was compiled. The Yeongjuijeong title was generally conferred on a senior minister who had previously served as Jwauijeong (Left State Councilor ), a post immediately below that of Yeonguijeong, but higher than that of Uuijeong (Right  State Councillor). The three posts were collectively referred to as "Samjeongseung" 삼정승  or "Samuijeong" (Three High Councillors).

List of the Chief State Councillors of Joseon period 

This table started as a translation of the :ko:영의정 (Yeonguijeong) page published by the Korean Wikipedia . The corresponding items are tagged "kp" in the "source" column. Not a single reference was provided in this page. For the 1st-14th reigns, a Gregorian installation date was given (the best possibility). In case of multiple occurrences e.g.	Seong Seokrin during Taejong reign, this is acknowledged by a tag in the "#" column. For the 14th-26th reigns, only the names were given, so that chronological order is not enforced. For example, Chae Jegong was cited once for the Jeongjo reign, while the biographical article :ko:채제공 (Chae Jegong) was listing 1776, 1790, 1793.

Additional material coming from the WorldStatesmen page  is tagged as "ws" in the source column. Here too, no references are given. When a cross-checking with the Korean page of a given statesman has been possible, hangul transcription and life dates have been borrowed.

In any case, the column KO is checked each time the corresponding biography exists on the Korean Wikipedia.

Changes of Yeonguijeong's roles 
Until April 1436, the 18th year of Sejong the Great's reign, Jwauijeong and Uuijeong concurrently served as Panijosa (判吏曹事) and Panbyeongjosa (判兵曹事) respectively, so that they governed personnel affairs of yangban (the literary and military nobility).

Yeonguijeong continued to exist as an honorary post, and so only managed to contemplate and adjust diplomatic documents or re-examine the cases of condemned people.

However, when Hwang Hui was appointed as "Yeonguijeong busa" in that same year, the king modified the government system to strengthen the power of Samjeongseung from the Yukjo (Six Ministries) centered system.  With the reform, Sejong noted that a situation in which three highest senior advisors could not participate in the state affairs contravened the original intention to have them as the high state councillors.

During the reform, Yukjo conferred with Uijeongbu regarding the responsibilities of each minister. Uijeongbu discussed legitimacy of the issues, and then reported to the king.  After receiving an approval from the king, Uijeongbu returned to Yujo to enact the assigned affairs.  As a result, Yeonguijeong came to participate more actively in the representative work as the head of Uijeongbu.  However, other ministerial duities, such as the rights of Ijo (吏曹; Ministry of Personnel) and Byeongjo (兵曹, Ministry of Military Affairs) to implement personnel management, Byeongjo's mobilization of soldiers, Hyeongjo (刑曹, Ministry of Punishments)'s right to handle all criminals other than condemned people, were still directly operated by the related ministers.

When Prince Suyang usurped the place of his nephew, King Danjong, the function of Yeonguijeong was relegated to its previous powerless position. This was because when the King Sejo was still a prince, his actions were greatly restricted by his political rivals, Yeonguijeong, Hwangbo In (皇甫仁) and Jwauijeong, Kim Jongseo (金宗瑞). So during the reigns of King Seongjong and Jungjong, there were several proposals to restore the former powers of Uijeongbu, but those suggestions were not implemented.

Major affairs of the state were discussed when Bibyeonsa was established in 1558 (during the 10th year of King Myeongjong's reign). The three High Councillors attended meetings only as "Dojejo" (Supreme Commissioner).  So the power of Yeonguijeong tended to be increased or decreased, depending on the political atmosphere of the times, such as the degree of the king's power, the relationship between Uijeongbu and Yukjo, the establishment of Bibyeonsa (備邊司; Border Defense Command), the later administration of Kyujanggak (the Royal Library), the conflicts between political parties, and the advancement of "in-law government" (勢道政治, Sedo jeongchi), among others. Regardless, the title "Yeonguijeong" continued as the apex in the bureaucratic system throughout the entire Joseon period.

See also
Joseon Dynasty politics
Yukjo (the Six Ministries of Joseon)
History of Korea

Notes

References

External links 
History of Korea; V. LIFE IN EARLY-CHOSON at KBS

Joseon dynasty
Politics of Korea